Wangi is a village in Kadegaon taluka, Sangli district, Maharashtra, India. The population was 9,895 at the 2011 Indian census.

Education
The New English School Wangi, an upper primary and secondary school, is located in Wangi.

References

Villages in Sangli district